Ball hockey is a team sport and an off-ice variant of the sport of ice hockey. The sport is also a variant of one of several floor hockey game codes but more specifically a variant of street hockey.

Ball hockey is patterned after and closely related to ice hockey, except the game is played on foot on a non-ice surface, player equipment is different, and an orange ball is used instead of a hockey puck.  The objective of the game is to score more goals than the opposing team by shooting the ball into the opposing team's net.

Gameplay
Teams consist of five runners and one goaltender.  The five runners are broken down into positions of three forwards and two defense-men, right and left.  The forwards are further described by position name:  Left Wing, Right Wing, and Center.  These positions are the same as in ice hockey.  Tournament Ball Hockey rules are numerous and too long to list in this article.  A list of the official ball hockey tournament rules of the I.S.B.H.F. can be found online. For general information's sake, Ball Hockey rules typically stipulate the following basics, meaning if you are playing under these rules, then you are playing Ball Hockey:

Offside is determined by a "floating blue line". The concept can be difficult to understand for non-hockey enthusiasts, but the simplest explanation is as follows: When the ball crosses the defending team's blue line, the attacking team is onside. The attacking team then has the entire zone up to the center line with which to work the ball around and still be considered onside. Once the ball crosses the center red line the attacking zone is "lost", and the attacking team's players must clear (retreat past) the defending team's blue line and have the ball enter past the defending team's blue line to be considered onside again.
Icing is called "flooring"in ball hockey.
You can raise your stick above the shoulder to call for a pass.
You can close your hand around the ball provided that you bring the ball straight down to your feet and do not change the direction you are moving in.
International rink dimensions are the same as international ice hockey rinks 197 ft × 98.4 ft.
North American rink dimensions are the same as North American ice hockey rinks 200 ft × 85 ft.

Equipment

The ball used is a specially designed one for ball hockey and street hockey.  The International Street and Ball Hockey Federation, the worldwide governing body of official street hockey tournaments and leagues, officially recognizes two types of ball for play: a hard (Pro) version for adult warm climate play and a soft version for non-summer play and younger youth age groups.  At the highest levels of ball hockey, teams use a hard, orange, small, round, and smooth orange/reddish ball 3 inches in diameter.  This allows for players to make the ball curve by over/under exaggerating a windup and follow through on their shots.  Several ball manufacturers now market the balls with the temperature range the ball was designed for on the packaging itself. Although there is no certified industry standard for the balls since no street hockey standards organization exists, all hockey ball manufacturers sell their balls according to the following temperature range: red/orange = hot/warm above 60 degrees (15 C), pink = cool - between 40-60 degrees (4.5-15 C)yellow = cold - below 40 degrees (4.5 C).

In most non-international tournaments, the following equipment requirements are instituted for the runners:

Helmets are mandatory for players.
Some type of hand gloves must be worn, and they do not have to be hockey gloves but they can not have strings lose.  Specific gloves for the sport of ball hockey have been developed and are manufactured and sold to ball hockey players.
Some type of shin guards must be worn, and they do not have to be hockey shin guards. Specific guards for the sport of ball hockey have been developed and are manufactured and sold to ball hockey players.
Teams must have matching jerseys with numbers.  These can often be T-shirts with numbers on them.
Appropriate footwear for running.
Some type of official hockey stick

NOTE:  Specific helmets, shin guards, and gloves for the sport of ball hockey have been developed and are manufactured and sold to ball hockey players, but it is not mandatory for players to wear these for all tournaments.

The following equipment requirements are instituted for goaltenders:

Goaltender's helmet with full face mask
Chest protector
Thigh pads
Goaltender leg pads
Goaltender Glove or trapper
Goaltender Blocker
Goaltender Stick
Shirt that fits OVER all chest equipment
Appropriate footwear

The flooring used for ball hockey tournaments is typically a specific type of a game court, often referred to as a "sport court".  Sport courts very simply are plastic modular tiles, typically 1 square foot, that snap together for quick installation and removal. Sport court, is the tiling of choice in Montreal at the famous arena Le Rinque. The tiles come in a variety of colors and are manufactured by several different companies.  The tiles often come prefabricated with lines on them which make up the markings required for tournament play, such as center and blue lines, face-off circles, and goal creases.

For official international tournaments, the I.S.B.H.F. rules apply, and players must wear protective equipment as stipulated in their rule book.

Governing bodies

International
The official worldwide governing body of the sport is the International Street and Ball Hockey Federation (ISBHF), which operates out of the Czech Republic and Canada. The federation consists of 39 countries and recognizes hundreds of thousands of players playing in organized leagues throughout the world.

Canada
The Canadian Ball Hockey Association  is the official governing body of ball hockey in Canada, however, numerous leagues operate independently of this organization in Canada. Official CBHA sanctioned leagues include:

British Columbia

· BC Ball Hockey Association

· West Coast Minor Hockey Association

Alberta

· Wild Rose Ball Hockey Association

· Alberta Minor Ball Hockey Association

Saskatchewan

· Prairie Central Ball Hockey Association

Manitoba

· Manitoba Ball Hockey Association

Ontario

· Ontario Ball Hockey Federation

Quebec

· Quebec Ball Hockey Association

New Brunswick

· New Brunswick Ball Hockey Association

Nova Scotia

· Nova Scotia Ball Hockey Association

Newfoundland & Labrador

· Newfoundland & Labrador Ball Hockey Association

United States
The governing body for ball hockey is USA Ball Hockey.  There is one officially sanctioned league operating in the United States, the National Ball Hockey League.

Europe and Asia
Several European and Asian countries have their own governing bodies where the sport has enough players to have a national following and presence.  A listing can be found at the ISBHF website.

History
In North America, Natives were first observed playing a variant of the game in 1572. In the 1960s Canada became the first nation to play the sport in organized leagues, followed by the United States the next decade, then countries in Europe in the 1980s and 1990s.

Recreational levels
Refer to the Street Hockey article for a more thorough description of recreational play.

See also
 Cosom hockey
 Road hockey
 Floor hockey
 Dek hockey
 Yeshiva League

References

 
Variations of hockey
Stick sports